The bobsleigh competitions of the Lillehammer 1994 Olympics were held at the Lillehammer Olympic Bobsleigh and Luge Track between 19 and 27 February 1994.

Medal summary

Medal table

Events
Two bobsleigh events were held at Lillehammer 1994 Olympics:

Participating NOCs
Thirty nations sent bobleists to compete in the events.

References

External links
1994 bobsleigh two-man results
1994 bobsleigh four-man results

 
1994 Winter Olympics
1994 Winter Olympics events
Olympics
Bobsleigh in Norway